Bokermannohyla napolii is a frog in the family Hylidae.  It is endemic to southeastern Brazil.  Scientists know it only from the type locality, 850 meters above sea level in Minas Gerais.

Original description

References

Species described in 2012
Frogs of South America
napolii